Brachmia japonicella is a moth in the family Gelechiidae. It was described by Zeller in 1877. It is found in Japan and Korea.

The wingspan is 15–19 mm.

References

Moths described in 1877
Brachmia
Moths of Asia